Pyrofomes is a genus of fungi in the family Polyporaceae. The genus was circumscribed by Czech mycologists František Kotlaba and Zdenek Pouzar in 1964. The type species, Pyrofomes demidoffii, was once considered a widespread species with a distribution that included East Africa, Middle Asia, Europe, and North America. DNA evidence demonstrated that North American collections represented a lineage that was different than European collections. The North American sibling was reinstated as P. juniperinus in 2017.

Species
Pyrofomes albomarginatus (Zipp. ex Lév.) Ryvarden (1972)
Pyrofomes castanopsidis B.K.Cui & Y.C.Dai (2011) – China
Pyrofomes demidoffii (Lév.) Kotl. & Pouzar (1964) – East Africa; Middle Asia; Europe
Pyrofomes fulvoumbrinus (Bres.) A.David & Rajchenb. (1985)
Pyrofomes juniperinus (H.Schrenk) Vlasák & Spirin (2017) – North America
Pyrofomes lateritius (Cooke) Ryvarden (1972)
Pyrofomes perlevis (Lloyd) Ryvarden (1972)
Pyrofomes tricolor (Murrill) Ryvarden (1972)

References

Polyporaceae
Polyporales genera
Taxa described in 1964